Clive Linton Platt (born 27 October 1977) is an English former professional footballer. A forward, he has made 618 appearances in the Football League, including 164 for Rochdale.

In his 19-year-long playing career, Platt had played for Walsall, Notts County, Peterborough United, Milton Keynes Dons, Colchester United, Coventry City, Northampton Town and Bury.

Club career

Walsall
Platt was born in Wolverhampton and began his playing career with Walsall as an apprentice in 1995. A spell of just 32 games over four years saw him loaned to Rochdale in 1999

Rochdale
A loan that secured him a permanent deal to Rochdale for a fee of £100,000 – then a club record. Platt went on to make 163 appearances and score 27 goals for the club.

Notts County
In 2003, Platt signed a monthly deal with Notts County, where he scored just three times despite being a first team regular. An indifferent year at Peterborough United followed, where Platt scored six times.

Milton Keynes Dons
Platt joined relegation-threatened Milton Keynes Dons in January 2005 and scored vital goals to help save the Dons from relegation under the guidance of Danny Wilson. However, the 2005–06 season was not much better for MK Dons, as they fought relegation again. Platt had a relatively fruitless campaign, but a good run of form towards the end of the season saw him finish second in the League One Player of the Month award for May and almost save the Dons from relegation.

The 2006–07 season saw MK Dons fighting for promotion from League Two. This turned out to be Platt's best season in terms of strike-rate, with him finding the net 18 times before suffering an injury that caused him to miss the first leg of a play-off tie against Shrewsbury Town and have an indifferent second leg.

Colchester United
In July 2007, Platt was sold to Championship side Colchester United for £300,000 – six times Colchester's previous transfer record. Before the transfer, Colchester had recently lost star goal-scorers Chris Iwelumo and Jamie Cureton to Charlton Athletic and Norwich City respectively.

In the 2007–08 season, Platt was paired up front with Kevin Lisbie and scored eight goals. In the 2008–09 season, however, he had many different strike partners, including Steven Gillespie, Mark Yeates, Scott Vernon and Jermaine Easter, and he notched 10 goals. In the 2009–10 season, he was once again paired up front with Kevin Lisbie, and he scored two goals on the opening day of the season.

Coventry City
Platt joined Coventry City on 29 July 2010. He made his first league appearance in a 2–0 victory against Portsmouth on 7 August. He also scored against Leicester City, Bristol City and Ipswich Town.
On 5 November 2011, Platt scored his 100th professional league goal, aged 34, against Southampton. The match ended in a 4–2 win for Southampton.

Northampton Town
On 25 May 2012, Platt signed for. Northampton Town, where he rejoined former manager Aidy Boothroyd. He scored his first goal for the club in the league cup second round match against Wolverhampton Wanderers. On 9 Jan 2014, it was announced that his contract had been terminated my mutual consent. This came just three weeks after Boothroyd's dismissal as manager.

Bury
On 24 January 2014, he signed a contract with Bury until the end of the 2013–14 season. Shakers manager David Flitcroft had recruited Platt on the same day that he managed to bring in Rochdale's Andrew Tutte and Jean-Louis Akpa Akpro of Tranmere Rovers.

Retirement
Platt retired from football in October 2014 due to persistent injury problems.

Career statistics

As of 2014/2015 season.

Honours
Milton Keynes Dons Player of the Year: 2006–07

References

External links

Profile at UpThePosh! The Peterborough United Database

1977 births
Living people
Footballers from Wolverhampton
English footballers
English Football League players
Association football forwards
Walsall F.C. players
Rochdale A.F.C. players
Notts County F.C. players
Peterborough United F.C. players
Milton Keynes Dons F.C. players
Colchester United F.C. players
Coventry City F.C. players
Northampton Town F.C. players
Bury F.C. players
Black British sportspeople